Kobell (Surname) may refer to:

Ferdinand Kobell (1740–1799), German painter and engraver
Franz Kobell (1749–1822), German painter, etcher, and draftsman
Hendrik Kobell (1751–1779), Dutch landscape and marine painter, etcher, draftsman, and watercolorist
Jan Kobell (1779–1814), Dutch animal and landscape painter
Wilhelm von Kobell (1766–1853), German painter, printmaker, and teacher
Wolfgang Franz von Kobell (1803–1882), German mineralogist, inventor, writer, and poet